The Women's 10 m platform competition of the 2016 European Aquatics Championships was held on 13 May 2016.

Results
The preliminary round was held at 12:30. The final was held at 19:30.

Green denotes finalists

References

Diving